Enhydrus is a genus of beetles in the family Gyrinidae, containing the following species:

 Enhydrus atratus Régimbart, 1877
 Enhydrus mirandus Ochs, 1955
 Enhydrus sulcatus (Wiedemann, 1821)
 Enhydrus tibialis Régimbart, 1877

References

Gyrinidae
Adephaga genera
Taxa named by François-Louis Laporte, comte de Castelnau